Hans Pinsker (1909–1979) was an Austrian linguist.

He was Professor and Chair at the Department of English at the University of Vienna. Pinsker is perhaps best known for his introduction to English historical grammar (written in German), which appeared in multiple editions (e.g. 2nd, rev. ed. 1963. 3rd ed. 1974 edition). He is also noted as an accomplished member of the Vienna School of English Linguistics ("Anglistik") and held the "Luick Chair" before Herbert Koziol and Herbert Schendl. Pinsker worked on Indo-European in addition to English historical linguistics.

Pinsker received a festschrift for his 70th birthday and other dedications for his 65th. After his death, the Hans-Pinsker-Fund, administered by the "Luick" Chair, was instituted to support student research in English Historical Linguistics.

Notable students 
Notable students of Pinsker include:
Peter Krämer, a German linguist
Nikolaus Ritt, an English historical linguist
Herbert Schendl, an English historical linguist

Publications 
Pinsker, Hans. 1974. Historische Englische Grammatik: Elemente der Laut-, Formen- und Wortbildungslehre. 3rd ed. Munich: Hueber.

References

Linguists from Austria
Academic staff of the University of Vienna
1909 births
1979 deaths
Date of birth missing
Date of death missing
20th-century linguists